Amy Fellows Cline (born April 3, 1974) is a Judge of the Kansas Court of Appeals.

Education and legal career

Cline received her Bachelor of Arts magna cum laude from Wichita State University in 1996 and her Juris Doctor from the University of Kansas School of Law in 2000. After graduating law school, Cline joined Fleeson, Gooing, Coulson & Kitch, LLC, representing clients in civil litigation in both state and federal courts. In 2004, she then worked at Triplett Woolf Garretson, LLC, where she became a partner in 2008.

Appointment to Kansas  Court of Appeals

In June 2020, Cline was one of twenty candidates who submitted an application to fill the vacancy left by the retirement of Judge Steve Leben. On July 15, 2020, Governor Laura Kelly appointed Cline to be a judge of the Kansas Court of Appeals to the seat vacated by Judge Joseph Pierron who retired. She was confirmed by the Kansas Senate on January 21, 2021, and sworn in on February 26, 2021, by Chief Judge Karen Arnold-Burger.

References

External links
Official Biography on Kansas Judicial Branch website

1974 births
Living people
20th-century American women lawyers
20th-century American lawyers
21st-century American judges
21st-century American women lawyers
21st-century American lawyers
Kansas lawyers
Kansas Court of Appeals Judges
People from Wichita, Kansas
University of Kansas School of Law alumni
Wichita State University alumni
21st-century American women judges